Óscar Casas (born 21 September 1998) is a Spanish actor.

Biography 
Óscar Casas was born on 21 September 1998 in Barcelona. He made his television debut as an actor at age 6 in the series Abuela de verano, whereas he made his feature film debut at age 8, appearing in the 2006 film . Owing to his resemblance to his elder brother Mario Casas (also an actor), he sometimes performed younger versions of the characters portrayed by Mario in his early career as a child actor.

Filmography

Film

Television

Accolades

References 

Living people
1998 births
Spanish male child actors
Spanish male film actors
Spanish male television actors
21st-century Spanish male actors